The enzyme (–)-endo-Fenchol synthase (EC 4.2.3.10) catalyzes the chemical reaction

geranyl diphosphate + HO  (–)-endo-fenchol + diphosphate

This enzyme belongs to the family of lyases, specifically those carbon-oxygen lyases acting on phosphates.  The systematic name of this enzyme class is geranyl-diphosphate diphosphate-lyase [cyclizing, (–)-endo-fenchol-forming]. Other names in common use include (−)-endo-fenchol cyclase, and geranyl pyrophosphate:(−)-endo-fenchol cyclase.  This enzyme participates in monoterpenoid biosynthesis.

References

 
 

EC 4.2.3
Enzymes of unknown structure